Coye is both a given name and a surname.

Notable people with the given name include:
Coye Dunn (1916–2000), American football player
Coye Francies (born 1986), American football player

Notable people with the surname include:
Jean-Baptiste Coye (1711–1771), French writer
Jose Coye (born 1942), Belizean politician
Kevin Coye (born 1976), American soccer player
Lee Brown Coye (1907–1981), American artist
Warren Coye (born 1965), Belizean cyclist

Given names